Cosmopterix mystica is a moth of the family Cosmopterigidae. It is from Australia.

References

mystica